Mazheika, Mazheyka, Mozheyko, Mozheiko are transliterations of the Russianized Lithuanian-language surname   Mažeika. The Polish-language form is Możejko. Notable people with this surname include:

 Igor Vsevolodovich Mozheiko, birth name of Kir Bulychev, Russian science fiction writer
, Soviet military commander, Hero of the Soviet Union
Vladimir Mozheyko, Soviet sprint canoer who competed in the early 1990s
 (1933-2014), Belarusian ethnomusicologist

 Surnames of Lithuanian origin
Russian-language surnames